The third season of CSI: Crime Scene Investigation premiered on CBS on September 26, 2002, and ended May 15, 2003. The series stars William Petersen and Marg Helgenberger.

Plot 
Grissom begins to suffer from hearing loss ("Inside the Box"), as Catherine faces the possibility of losing her daughter ("Lady Heather's Box") during the third season of CSI. Alongside their team, including Sara Sidle, Warrick Brown, Nick Stokes, and Jim Brass, Willows and Grissom investigate the death of a poker player ("Revenge is Best Served Cold"), the evisceration of a cheerleader ("Let the Seller Beware"), a death at a little persons convention ("A Little Murder"), the overdose of a rock-star ("Abra-Cadaver"), a jewelry heist ("Fight Night"), a mob murder ("Blood Lust"), the discovery of a body covered in fire-ants ("Snuff"), and a drive-by shooting ("Random Acts of Violence"). Meanwhile, the team are faced with their own past when they testify in court ("The Accused is Entitled"), Sara struggles to cope with the psychological trauma that she is suffering from being caught up in the explosion ("Play with Fire"), and one of Doc Robbins' autopsies goes awry when the victim wakes up ("Got Murder?").

Cast

Changes
Eric Szmanda and Robert David Hall, who joined the recurring cast in season one, become main cast members this season.

Main cast
 
 William Petersen as CSI Level 3 Night Shift Supervisor Gil Grissom
 Marg Helgenberger as CSI Level 3 Assistant Night Shift Supervisor Catherine Willows
 Gary Dourdan as CSI Level 3 Warrick Brown
 George Eads as CSI Level 3 Nick Stokes
 Jorja Fox as CSI Level 3 Sara Sidle 
 Eric Szmanda as DNA Technician Greg Sanders
 Robert David Hall as Clark County Coroner's Office Chief Medical Examiner Dr. Al Robbins
 Paul Guilfoyle as LVPD Homicide Unit Captain Jim Brass

Recurring cast

Guest cast

Episodes

References

External links
 DVD Release Dates at TVShowsOnDVD.com.

03
2002 American television seasons
2003 American television seasons